Continuum International Publishing Group was an academic publisher of books with editorial offices in London and New York City. It was purchased by Nova Capital Management in 2005. In July 2011, it was taken over by Bloomsbury Publishing. , all new Continuum titles are published under the Bloomsbury name (under the imprint Bloomsbury Academic).

History
Continuum International was created in 1999 with the merger of the Cassell academic and religious lists and the Continuum Publishing Company, founded in New York in 1980.

The academic publishing programme was focused on the humanities, especially the fields of philosophy, film and music, literature, education, linguistics, theology, and biblical studies. Continuum published Paulo Freire's seminal Pedagogy of the Oppressed.

Continuum acquired Athlone Press, which was founded in 1948 as the University of London publishing house and sold to the Bemrose Corporation in 1979.

In 2003, Continuum acquired the London-based Hambledon & London (Sunday Times Small Publisher of the Year 2001–02), a publisher of trade history for the general reader.

Imprints 
 Burns & Oates
 Hambledon Continuum – history publishing imprint
 T&T Clark
 Thoemmes Press

References

External links 
Official website

Book publishing companies of the United Kingdom
Book publishing companies based in New York (state)
Publishing companies established in 1999
1999 establishments in New York (state)